Smt. Chandibai Himathmal Mansukhani College also known as Smt. C.H.M. College of Arts, Science, Commerce and Management, Mass Media and Information Technology, is one of the largest colleges in Mumbai. Management belongs to the Hyderabad (Sind) National Collegiate Board. It has 03 UGC sponsored community outreach centers.

The foundation stone of the college was installed on 1 January 1964 by Principal K.M. Kundnani, Rector and Secretary, H.S.N.C Board, Barrister Hotchand G. Advani, president of the Board, Late Shri Gangaram Himatmal Mansukhani.

CHM college has more than 400 teaching and non-teaching staff members on its roll and more than 9500 students in six faculties. The college offers education to students at Junior, Undergraduate Degree and Post-Graduate levels.

Foundation 

Starting as an institution to cater to the aspirations of the minority Sindhi community, Smt. CHM College is the brainchild of educationists including Principal K. M. Kundnani and Barrister H.G. Advani and Mr. Gangaram Mansukhani.

After being displaced from his native land Sindh, now in Pakistan because of partition of India on 15 August 1947, Principal K. M. Kundnani reached Mumbai with a mission to resurrect National College which he had to close down at Sindh. He initiated the establishment of fourteen educational institutions with a view to arousing intellectual and spiritual strength of the people.

He had personally supervised the construction of Smt. CHM College. In this effort he had the support of Barrister H. G. Advani and Mr. Kishinchand Chellaram, Mr. Wassiamull Assomull and Mr. J. Watumull. The sixth institution set up was Smt. CHM College at Ulhasnagar. The college was established in 1965 with about 250 students and four departments has transformed into one of the largest colleges of the University of Mumbai with enrollment of more than 11,000 students, six faculties, 22 Undergraduate Departments, 8 Postgraduate Departments, 7 Research Centers, 7 Professional Courses, 7 Dual Degree Courses and 3 Prestigious UGC sponsored community outreach centers.

College provides exposure to sports, National Cadet Corps and National Service Scheme. The co-curricular and extra-curricular activities of the college are channelised through the various associations of the college namely Science Association, Commerce Association, Arts Forum and Sindhi Sahitya Sangat.

The institution provides community enrichment programmes.
Sandesh College of Arts Commerce & Science is affiliated with C.H.M. College for courses.

Campus

It has spacious classrooms and facilities including library, offices, staff common room, canteen, annex building, conference halls, computer laboratories, upgraded laboratories in the science, psychology and geography departments and well-developed sports grounds. It is almost equidistant (about 60 km) from Mumbai, Karjat and Kasara. This college offers conventional and professional courses.

Sports
It has an area of 19940sq.ft., houses facilities for indoor games like Table tennis, Carrom, Chess, Gymnasium for workouts, Boxing, Weightlifting, and Judo. It has two playgrounds-one foreground and second on the rear side. It has facilities for Hand Ball, Volley Ball, Basket Ball, Soft Ball, Ball Badminton, Kabaddi, Kho Kho, Football and Athletics.

Women Development Cell (WDC)
As per the requirement of the University of Mumbai the college has established a women's Development Cell, to generate gender awareness and sensitivity among the students and the faculty. The WDC seeks to promote respect for women at the workplace, address issue that specifically pertain to women, identify problems of working women and try to resolve them in a well-negotiated manner.

Library
The library has broadband BSNL connection for students and staff. It has a membership of British Council Library;Since 2003 and American Library centre. It also has total number of 74,230 Books, including 16,000 textbooks, 101 Journal and 28 newspapers. The college library also provides Book Bank facility to degree college students in first-cum-first-served-basis.

Laboratories
The college has 15 laboratories in the subject of Chemistry, Physics, botany, Zoology, and Microbiology, Computer Science and I.T., DMLT, and analytical Chemistry Laboratory for the Junior and Degree college and PG Diploma courses. The Geography and Psychology departments have laboratories for the Undergraduate course. The laboratories are equipped with modern instruments to cater to the needs of the present syllabus and beyond. The Chemistry department has a post-graduate laboratory, the Microbiology department has two research laboratories and the Physics department has one research laboratory. The college has Computer Laboratories with peer-to- peer network and internet for these of students to meet all necessary curriculum requirements and also beyond it. A Language Laboratory has been set up with a grant from the UGC. The Language Lab will provide special coaching in English, Marathi, Hindi and Sindhi language teaching and will seek to improve the spoken and written communication skills of our students.

Reading Room
225 students can be accommodated in large and reading room attached to the Main Library. The facility is provided from 7.00 a.m. to 8.00 p.m. (13hours). Reference books, magazines, daily newspapers are provided to the students.

Botanical Garden
The college has the Principal K. M. Kundnani Botanical Garden and its conservatory, and is developing a medicinal garden.

N.C.C. Obstacles Zone
This college has a National Cadet Corps (NCC) unit, 6 Mah. Bn. Mumbai 'A' Group. In CHM College NCC there are many activities undertaken, like Firing camp, Annual Training Camp, Blood Donation Camp, Paragliding Camp, Thal Sainik Camp, Republic Day Camp, Paratrooping Camp, and IMA Attachment Camp. NCC Cadets also help in maintaining the college environment, discipline and rules, as stipulated by the college.

Cultural activities
The college initiates various cultural activities including the Bhajan Prabhat and Bhajan Sandhya at the beginning of two terms; the Gaurav Diwas, in commemoration of the spirit of Republic nature of India on 26 January; the Chandi Utsav - the proceeds of which are donated to the Shantivan Ashram, Panvel. The College Annual Day honours students who have excelled in academics, sports, co-curricular, extracurricular activities and community services. The two best students each from Degree and Junior College are selected as Mr. Chandi and Miss Chandi. Applications are invited from meritorious students and they are evaluated along the parameters of Academic, Extra-curricular/Co-curricular/Extra Mural Activities, Group discussions, Personal Interviews and Public Performance. A separate panel of judges is appointed for all these events and the criteria for evaluation is determined and displayed well in advance.

UGC initiative

C.H.M. college is the First College in the state of Maharashtra to be awarded the Women’s Studies Center by the UGC. The major Project of the WSC has been the Adult Education Programme in which the centre motivates and sponsors women from the lower economic strata of society. The other activities of the Centre are Shelter of Health and Education (SHE) in collaboration with the local administration Ulhasnagar Municipal Corporation. The WSC has also organised seminars and workshops and gender awareness sessions in association with the WDC, the NSS and the GSC of the College and NGOs like Akshara. An International Conference was organised by the WSC & GSC in September 2007

College magazine
The college magazine Chandi is published every year in the second term. It reflects the entire set up of the college, its working during the year, and the progress made in different avenues. It contains articles on literary, academic and topical subjects. It also contains photographs of the activities of the college. The magazine is an almost completely in-house production, which is managed by the magazine team composed of students and teachers, who are involved in its production from the conceptualising to the printing stages.

The editor of Chandi is Dr. Deepa Mishra.

See also
List of Mumbai Colleges

References

External links
 Nostalgic Photo collection of CHM College

Educational institutions established in 1965
Universities and colleges in Mumbai
1965 establishments in Maharashtra
Colleges in India